The Montreal-North Arctic were a Junior "A" ice hockey team from Saint-Leonard, Quebec, Canada and were part of the Quebec Junior Hockey League.

History
The franchise entered the QJAAAHL in 2002 as the Gladiateur de St. Eustache

In the Summer of 2008, the team moved to become the Sainte-Thérèse Nordiques.

In the Summer of 2009, the team was moved again to Laval, Quebec.  The official name was Rousseau-Sports Junior AAA Laval.  In the 2008–09 season Eliezer Sherbatov led the team and was third in the league in scoring. In the playoffs, he helped the team win the championship while leading the playoffs with 15 goals in 18 games.

In 2010, the name was changed again to the Laval Arctic. One season later they became the St-Leonard Arctic.  After the start of the 2017 season the club re-branded once more, this time becoming the Montreal-North Arctic.

The North Arctic folded after the 2018-19 season.

Season-by-season record
Note: GP = Games Played, W = Wins, L = Losses, T = Ties, OTL = Overtime Losses, GF = Goals for, GA = Goals against

Notable players

Eliezer Sherbatov (born 1991), Canadian-Israeli ice hockey player

References

External links
Arctic Webpage

Ligue de Hockey Junior AAA Quebec teams
Ice hockey teams in Montreal
Saint-Leonard, Quebec
2002 establishments in Quebec
Ice hockey clubs established in 2002